The Winona Formation (also called the Winona Sand or the Winona Greensand) is a sand geologic formation in Mississippi.  It preserves fossils dating back to the Paleogene period.

Description
The Winona Formation was originally described as a member of the Tallahatta Formation or as a member of the Lisbon Formation, both of which are members of the Claiborne Group. It was upgraded to formation status and is considered a separate formation from both by the Mississippi Dept. of Environmental Quality Office of Geology. The Winona formation is a medium to fine grain poorly sorted sand that contains silt, clay, and fossils. It has a high glauconite content, up to 50% in some areas. Fossils, molds, and casts are commonly found in lithified beds, and the fossil assemblage includes bivalves, gastropods, echinoids, shark teeth, crabs, foraminifera, and ostracods. The depositional environment for this formation is considered a shallow-water, near shore marine shelf facies as part of a marine transgression series.

See also

 List of fossiliferous stratigraphic units in Mississippi
 Paleontology in Mississippi

References

 

Paleogene Mississippi